Recorded Time and Other Stories is a Big Finish Productions audio drama based on the long-running British science fiction television series Doctor Who.  As the 150th release, it is made of four one-part stories, by different authors, rather than the usual multi-part serial.  All episodes feature the Sixth Doctor as played by Colin Baker and Peri Brown played by Nicola Bryant.

Main cast
The Doctor — Colin Baker
Peri Brown — Nicola Bryant

Recorded Time
By Catherine Harvey

1536, The Court of King Henry VIII Immortalis.
Henry VIII — Paul Shearer
Anne Boleyn — Laura Molyneux
Scrivener — Philip Bretherton
Marjorie — Rosanna Miles

Paradoxicide
By Richard Dinnick

The legendary lost world of Sendos was rumored to have the most powerful weapons in the universe.  Now it is broadcasting across space in Peri's voice.
Inquisa — Raquel Cassidy
Centuria / Ship — Joan Walker
Barond — James George
Volsci — Laura Molyneux / Rosanna Miles

A Most Excellent Match
By Matt Fitton

In Jane Austen's England, Peri was seen to be courting suitors, including the Doctor.
Tilly — Rosanna Miles
Darcy / D'Urberville / Heathcliff — Philip Bretherton
Cranton — Paul Shearer

Question Marks
By Philip Lawrence

The mysterious man with the question mark collar saves the crew of a stricken vessel.
Destiny Gray — Raquel Cassidy
Greg Stone — James George
Arnie McAllister — Joe Jameson

Continuity
The First Doctor also quarreled with Henry VIII, as he explained in The Sensorites.
The Tenth Doctor was briefly married to the daughter of Henry and Anne Boleyn, Elizabeth I ("The End of Time", "The Day of the Doctor"), resulting in another quarrel ("The Shakespeare Code").

Cast notes
Raquel Cassidy was in the 2011 Doctor Who television story "The Rebel Flesh" / "The Almost People".

Critical reception
Doctor Who Magazine reviewer Matt Michael called the collection "excellent", identifying "A Most Excellent Match" as the "most fun", and "Question Marks" as the "strongest".

References

External links
Big Finish Productions - Recorded Time and Other Stories

2011 audio plays
Sixth Doctor audio plays
Fiction set in the 1530s
Fiction set in the 24th century